Arif Saleem Bohru, is an Indian professional wrestler better known by his ring name Badshah Khan. Bohru is also the first professional wrestler from Jammu and Kashmir region of India.  He currently works in The Great Khali's Continental Wrestling Entertainment where he is the current CWE World Heavyweight Champion.  In 2021, Arif is expected to take part in the WWE India tryouts at Mumbai. Bohru is currently among the top five wrestlers in India.

Professional wrestling career

First wrestler from Jammu and Kashmir
Badshah Khan became the first professional wrestler from Jammu and Kashmir. He is also the first person from Jammu and Kashmir to train under The Great Khali at CWE academy in Jalandhar.

Continental Wrestling Entertainment (2016-present) 
In 2016, Arif Bohru entered wrestling through the promotion from The Great Khali's Continental Wrestling Entertainment. Arif began his training as a professional wrestler. In 2016, Arif Bohru made his wrestling debut under the ring name "Badshah Khan" given to him by The Great Khali. Arif won the Tag Team Championship twice.  On 18 March 2018, he won his first CWE World Heavyweight Championship. In 2021, Khan is set to debut in the World Wrestling Entertainment (WWE).

Personal life
Arif Bohru hails from Neel, Ramban district. His father, Mohammed Saleem Bohru, is a CRPF sub-inspector.

References

Indian professional wrestlers
1988 births
Living people
Indian wrestlers
People from Ramban district